Sheela Balaji leads the Indian educational nonprofit organization (NGO) AIM For Seva. She is known for preservation of rice varieties, starting with four varieties and now having thirty. She was awarded the Nari Shakti Puraskar for her work and leads one of the largest organisations offering free education in India. She hails from the powerful family behind the TVS group and is the grand-daughter of T. V. Sundram Iyengar.

Life 
Balaji is the managing trustee and chair of a nonprofit organization (NGO) named AIM For Seva. The organisation runs a large school in Manjakkudi in Tamil Nadu and also has 100 hostels across India. She is also responsible for the Swami Dayananda Educational Trust.

The school is an area where there are paddy fields growing rice. She noticed that a farmer was spraying a lot of chemicals on some rice and she asked why he did it, knowing that the chemicals were bad for him. She was told that the rice variety that was being used would only grow productively if it was treated with chemicals. Balaji decided to find out more and it was agreed that she could plant unusual varieties of rice on 40 acres of land.

In 2011, her book Swami Dayananda Saraswati: Contributions & Writings, was published.

In 2013, Balaji organised a festival in Manjakkudi dedicated to grains. The annual festival has attracted farmers and it has led to the rediscovery of old rice varieties. 

She began by growing four rice varieties but it grew to thirty. To make the rice cultivation sustainable she opened a store in Chennai where her varieties of rice can be bought. A map of Manjakkudi is used as the logo and the packaging describes the properties of the rice and the historically claimed health benefits.

In 2015, her book Without a Second: Concepts of Non Duality was published.

In 2018, she was awarded the Nari Shakti Puraskar. The award was invested by President of India Ram Nath Kovind at the Presidential Palace (Rastrapati Bhavan) in New Delhi with the Prime Minister of India, Narendra Modi, also attending. About 40 people or organisations were honoured that year, receiving the award and a prize of $R 100,000.

References 

Living people
Nari Shakti Puraskar winners
Year of birth missing (living people)